Taryn Christion (born February 6, 1997) is a former American professional Canadian football quarterback who was most recently a member of the Ottawa Redblacks of the Canadian Football League (CFL). He played college football at South Dakota State.

College career
Christion played for the South Dakota State Jackrabbits for four seasons. Christion finished his collegiate career with school records of 11,535 passing yards, 104 touchdown passes, 13,050 yard of total offense, 814 pass completions, and 1,363 pass attempts.

Professional career

Seattle Seahawks
Christion was signed by the Seattle Seahawks as an undrafted free agent on April 28, 2019. He was waived by the Seahawks on May 14, 2019.

Dallas Cowboys
Christion was signed by the Dallas Cowboys on July 24, 2019. He was waived during final roster cuts on August 31, 2019.

Pittsburgh Steelers
Christion was signed by the Pittsburgh Steelers to their practice squad on October 2, 2019. He was signed specifically to imitate Baltimore Ravens quarterback Lamar Jackson in practice. Christion was released on October 7, 2019.

Ottawa Redblacks
Christion was signed by Ottawa Redblacks of the Canadian Football League on January 21, 2020. He announced his retirement on May 7, 2022.

References

External links
South Dakota State Jackrabbits bio

1997 births
Living people
Canadian football quarterbacks
American players of Canadian football
American football quarterbacks
South Dakota State Jackrabbits football players
Players of American football from South Dakota
Ottawa Redblacks players
Pittsburgh Steelers players
Dallas Cowboys players
Seattle Seahawks players
Sportspeople from Sioux Falls, South Dakota